Frank Öivind Stefan Andersson (9 May 1956 – 9 September 2018) was a Swedish amateur wrestler and entertainer. He started in amateur wrestling, winning several world championship gold medals as well as a bronze medal at the 1984 Summer Olympics in Los Angeles. He later became a professional wrestler with mixed success. He was also a television personality appearing on several Swedish reality and game shows.

Amateur wrestling career

Frank Andersson's amateur wrestling career included gold medals at the 1973 and 1975 Junior World Championships and as he got older he wrestled at a number of Greco-Roman wrestling World Championships over the years. In 1977, 1979 and 1982 he won the gold medal in the  division. He also took the silver medal in 1978 and 1981. The pinnacle of his amateur wrestling career came in 1984 at the 1984 Summer Olympics in Los Angeles where he won a bronze medal in the 90 kg weight division. In addition to his in ring achievements, Andersson was awarded the Svenska Dagbladet Gold Medal in 1977. He was inducted in the Amateur Wrestling Hall of Fame in 2006.

Professional wrestling career
Andersson was trained for his professional career by Brad Rheingans, a former Olympian as well, and made his debut on 3 May 1991 for the American Wrestling Association, defeating Randy Thornton, who also debuted. Within months, he went to Japan, wrestling for New Japan Pro-Wrestling (NJPW) teaming with Rheingans.

On April 8, 1993, he worked one night only for the WWE when he defeated Red Tyler in Paris, France at a European Tour show.

In 1994, he signed with World Championship Wrestling (WCW), based in Atlanta. Andersson would win upset victories over Booker T., Stevie Ray and Alex Wright. He retired in 1995.

Andersson made his comeback in 2014 for STHLM, a promotion based in Stockholm, Sweden. Teaming with Jim Duggan in a tag match. He won the STHLM title on 6 September when he defeated Ken Malmsteen in the main event.

Media career
He was a participant on Let's Dance 2011, the Swedish version of Strictly Come Dancing / Dancing with the Stars, where he finished second.

In his youth Andersson recorded the music single "Frank's Disco", the song contains music and Andersson being interviewed in the background.

Andersson also appeared in the film Göta Kanal in 1981. He participated as a celebrity contestant on Expedition Robinson V.I.P. He also appeared on the seventh season of Mästarnas mästare; broadcast on SVT, he was the first to be eliminated.

Personal life 
Andersson was diagnosed with attention deficit hyperactivity disorder in 2010.

Death 
In late August 2018, Andersson was admitted to hospital with heart problems. On 6 September, Andersson went through surgery. A few days later, he developed complications, and on 9 September 2018, he died at the age of 62.

Championships and accomplishments
STHLM Wrestling
STHLM Wrestling Championship (1 time)
Pro Wrestling Illustrated
PWI ranked him #115 of the 500 best singles wrestlers in the PWI 500 in 1994

References

External links
 

1956 births
2018 deaths
Swedish male sport wrestlers
Swedish male professional wrestlers
Wrestlers at the 1976 Summer Olympics
Wrestlers at the 1980 Summer Olympics
Wrestlers at the 1984 Summer Olympics
Olympic wrestlers of Sweden
Medalists at the 1984 Summer Olympics
Olympic medalists in wrestling
Olympic bronze medalists for Sweden
World Wrestling Championships medalists
Sportspeople from Västra Götaland County
People from Trollhättan